Purwodadi is a district in Musi Rawas Regency, South Sumatra, Indonesia.

Administrative villages
Karanganyar consists of 11 villages (kelurahan or desa) namely:
Bangun Sari
Karyadadi
Kerto Sari
Mangun Harjo
Mardi Harjo
Pagersari
Purwakarya
Purwodadi
Rejo Sari
Sadar Karya
Tri Karya

References

External links
 

Districts of South Sumatra